The Godparents (Los Padrinos is a 1973 Argentine film.

Cast
 Gabriel Aragón
 Mercedes Carreras
 Emilio Aragón

External links
 

1973 films
Argentine comedy films
1970s Spanish-language films
1970s Argentine films
Films directed by Enrique Carreras